Shihab al-Islam Abu'l-Mahasin Abd al-Razzaq, commonly known as Shihab al-Islam, was a Persian religious scholar and jurist, who served as the vizier of the Seljuk sultan Ahmad Sanjar from April 1118 till his death in March 1121. He was the son of Abu'l-Qasim Abdullah, the brother of the distinguished vizier Nizam al-Mulk (died 1092).

References

Sources 
 

11th-century Iranian writers
12th-century Iranian writers
Viziers of the Seljuk Empire
11th-century births
1121 deaths
People from Tus, Iran
Dehqans